First Priority is a youth organization that supports student-initiated, student-led Christian clubs on middle school and high school campuses.

First Priority of America, Inc. supports local city FP movements in cities across the US.

First Priority Strategy was founded by 12 youth Pastors in the Irving, TX area. The first city to take this strategy and follow it through to maturity is found in Birmingham, AL.

The vision of First Priority is to take the Hope of Christ to every student in the United States. They do that by uniting the body of Christ (area churches) with a plan of action to influence the schools with the gospel. The plan of action is to encourage, equip, and empower the Christian students from those area churches to form a Christian First Priority Club at school to share the life, death, and resurrection of Jesus. This is the primary distinction between First Priority and other club ministries: that they are a local-church strategy rather than a para-church ministry.  First Priority works to empower the 325,000 Evangelical churches to reach the students in 41,000 Public Middle and High schools in the U.S.

Local Organizations
First Priority Greater Birmingham, AL, Executive Directors - (Debi DeBoer)
First Priority South Florida, Executive Director - (Chris Lane)
First Priority of LakeShore (Western, MI), Executive Director - (Sandy Mast)
First Priority of South Mississippi, Executive Director - (JD Simpson)
First Priority Muskegon, MI, Area Director - (Jim Keck)
First Priority Tri-States (East TN/KY-West VA), Executive Director - (Emery Minton)
First Priority Tri-County/Lake Cumberland KY, Area Director - (Tim Bargo)
First Priority Tampa, FL, Area Director - (Amber Johansen)
First Priority Greater Nashville, TN, Area Director - (Steve Cherrico)
First Priority Great Plains (SD, IA), Area Coordinator - (Casey Antillon)
First Priority Greater Decatur, Executive Director - (Larry Franks)
First Priority Cincinnati, OH - District Director - (Justin Theriot)
First Priority TN-1 District, District Director - (David North)
First Priority ArkLaTex, Area Director - (Michael Butler)
First Priority Permian Basin, TX - Executive Director - (Shane Kenney)
First Priority Heritage, KY - Executive Director - (Steve Dismuke)
First Priority Los Banos, CA, Area Coordinator - (Justin Lopes)
First Priority North AL, Executive Director -  (Phil Springer)
First Priority North Georgia - (Darin Peppers)
First Priority Southeast Kentucky - (Bo Lee)
First Priority of Pensacola, FL- (Breanna Weidlich)
First Priority of Metro East St. Louis, MO- (Larry Bragg)
First Priority of Kansas City, District Director - (Season Tingler)
First Priority of Fort Worth, TX, District Director - (Will Sherman)
First Priority of Johnston County, NC- (Rachel Gardiner)
First Priority of Greater Lubbock, TX- (Carter Shuman)
First Priority of Oklahoma City, OK- (Stan Stafford)
First Priority of Wake County, NC - (John Roberts)

References

External links 
 First Priority of America - National organization site

Youth organizations based in the United States